Horom Citadel (also Romanized as Orom and Horrom) is an ancient Bronze Age through Urartian fortification atop two large hills south of the main road and opposite of the dam and Kamut Reservoir. Not far from this location in Ghak and Shvaghtapa are two Urartian cyclopean forts.
  
Horom is considered to be one of the most impressive archaeological sites in Armenia because of its unique architecture.  There are potsherds and obsidian flakes strewn on the surface of the ground.  Recent excavations have been underway at the site recently by Armenian and American archaeologists led by Ruben Badalian and Philip Kohl.  The teams have uncovered a well preserved fortification walls as well as large amounts of cultural artifacts that have given insight into those who once resided at the site.

References 
 

Archaeological sites in Armenia
Castles in Armenia
Forts in Armenia
Urartian cities
Tourist attractions in Shirak Province
Buildings and structures in Shirak Province